Minuscule 335 (in the Gregory-Aland numbering), ε 601 (Soden), is a Greek minuscule manuscript of the New Testament, on paper. Paleographically it has been assigned to the 16th century.

Description 

The codex contains a complete text of the four Gospels on 112 paper leaves. The text is written in one column per page, in 29 lines per page. It contains Prolegomena and Argumentum. It has numbers of stichoi to the Gospel of Matthew.

Text 

The Greek text of the codex is a representative of the Byzantine text-type. Aland placed it in Category V.

It was non examined by the Claremont Profile Method.

History 

The manuscript was examined by Pasino, Scholz, and Burgon. It was added to the list of New Testament manuscripts by Scholz (1794-1852).
C. R. Gregory saw it in 1886.

The manuscript is currently housed at the Turin National University Library (B. III. 2) in Turin.

See also 

 List of New Testament minuscules
 Biblical manuscript
 Textual criticism

References

Further reading 

 Giuseppe Passino, Codices manuscripti. Bibliothecae Regii Taurinensis Athenaei, Turin 1742, Teil 2.

Greek New Testament minuscules
16th-century biblical manuscripts